Epanorin is a lichen secondary metabolite with the molecular formula C25H25NO6. Epanorin inhibits the proliferation of MCF-7 cancer cells.

References

Further reading 

 
 

Lichen products
Biological pigments
Amides
Furanones
Methyl esters